The Alexandra Hospital is a specialist mental health care hospital in Cape Town, South Africa. It provides care for complex mental health issues and intellectual disability.

The grounds of the hospital also include the historic windmill, De Nieuwe Molen.

References

Hospitals in Cape Town
Intellectual disability hospitals